Tsatsane is a community council located in the Quthing District of Lesotho. Its population in 2006 was 9,452.

Villages
The community of Tsatsane includes the villages of Ha 'MaKo (Tosing), Ha Choko, Ha Falatsa, Ha France, Ha Hlaela, Ha Hlanyane, Ha Lephahamela, Ha Liphapang, Ha Mafura (Ha Maphasa), Ha Mafura (Ha Moso), Ha Mafura (Khorong), Ha Mafura (Mokhatseng),  Ha Mafura (Moreneng), Ha Mafura (Sekhitsaneng), Ha Mafura (Tereseng), Ha Maleka, Ha Malibeng, Ha Mateisi, Ha Mathe, Ha Matiase, Ha Mofokeng, Ha Mongoli, Ha Montši, Ha Mosele, Ha Motsumi, Ha Mpapa, Ha Phoofo (Dalewe), Ha Raemile, Ha Ralebona (Dalewe), Ha Ramanasi, Ha Ranthoto, Ha Sekhobe, Ha Sekonyela, Ha Seliba, Ha Thaha, Ha Thibella, Koti-se-phola, Kueneng, Lahla-Nkobo, Lihlabeng (Ha Jobo), Lipeleng (Dalewe), Litšoeneng, Litšoeneng (Tosing), Mabele-a-tlala, Mahlanyeng, Mapeleng, Maqebeng, Masoothong, Matebeleng, Mateleng (Tosing), Matšela-habeli (Tiping), Mokema, Mokhoabong, Morataleng, Nonyana-e'a-mpitsa, Sekoaing, Selomong (Aupolasi), Seoling, Teraeng (Dalewe), Thaba-Ntšo, Tlokoeng and Tsekong.

References

External links
 Google map of community villages

Populated places in Quthing District